Jesse Thaler is an American particle physicist who is a professor at the MIT Department of Physics. He was named director of the NSF Institute for Artificial Intelligence and Fundamental Interactions (IAIFI) upon its creation in August 2020.

Education and research 
Thaler grew up in York, Maine, and attended high school at Phillips Exeter Academy, where he won the Cox Medal, an award for the top five in the graduating class. From 1998 to 2002, he pursued a physics major magna cum laude from Brown University, where he was a member of Phi Beta Kappa and a funk band. In 2006, Thaler earned a Ph.D. in physics from Harvard University under the supervision of Nima Arkani-Hamed. He went to Berkeley as a Miller Fellow before returning to New England to become a faculty member at the MIT Center for Theoretical Physics in 2010. He earned tenure in 2017 and was promoted to full professor in 2021. 

Since 2020 Thaler is inaugural Director of the one of the inaugural NSF AI research institutes, the Institute for Artificial Intelligence and Fundamental Interactions, along with Deputy Director Mike Williams. IAIFI received $20 million in initial funding.

Thaler focuses on fusing "techniques from QFT and machine learning to address outstanding questions in fundamental physics." He has made major contributions towards understanding the substructure of jets, the large collections of particles that are produced when two high-energy particles collide with one another in an experiment like the LHC. Thaler applies machine learning techniques to understand and interpret the large quantities of data experimentalists collect about these cascades of particles, which in turn can both further physicists' knowledge about the Standard Model of particle physics and has the potential to shed light on new physics.

In addition to his collider physics work, Thaler also helped design a dark matter experiment, ABRACADABRA, that looks for axions and is currently in operation.

Teaching and Mentoring 
Thaler has won multiple awards from MIT for his mentorship of students, including the Buechner Faculty Award for Undergraduate Advising (2013), the Buechner Faculty Award for Teaching (2014), and the Perkins Award for Excellence in Graduate Advising (2017), as well as the Certificate of Distinction for Excellence in Teaching from Harvard (2005). Many of his graduate students and postdocs have gone onto careers in academia, including as professors at MIT, UIUC, and the University of Michigan. His former undergraduate research advisees include three Marshall Scholars. Along with colleague Mike Williams, Thaler also created and co-chairs a new interdisciplinary PhD program in physics, statistics, and data science since 2020.

Filmography 
Thaler appeared in the movie Particle Fever.

Awards 
 Fellow of the American Physical Society (2022)
 Fermilab Distinguished Scholar (2020)
Simons Fellow in Theoretical Physics (2018)
 Edgerton Faculty Achievement Award, MIT (2017)
Sloan Research Fellowship (2013)
 Presidential Early Career Award for Scientists and Engineers (2012)
 DOE Early Career Award (2011)
 Miller Fellowship, Berkeley (2006)
 Goldhaber Prize, Harvard (2005)
National Science Foundation Graduate Research Fellowship (2002)
Phi Beta Kappa (2001)

References

External links 
 IAIFI

Massachusetts Institute of Technology School of Science faculty
Brown University alumni
Harvard University alumni
Year of birth missing (living people)
Scientists from Maine
People from York, Maine
American physicists
Artificial intelligence researchers
Particle physicists
MIT Center for Theoretical Physics faculty
Phillips Exeter Academy alumni
Living people
Fellows of the American Physical Society